Paula C. Lodi is a United States Army major general who serves as Commanding General of the 18th Medical Command (Deployment Support) since June 15, 2022. She previously served as Deputy Commanding General for Support of the United States Army Medical Command from July 2021 to May 2022. Lodi was the first female commander of the 44th Medical Brigade. She is also the younger sister of Lieutenant General Maria Barrett. Lodi and Barrett are the United States Army's first ever sister General Officer tandem.

Early and personal life
Lodi grew up in Franklin, Massachusetts, outside of Boston. She is the daughter of Ruston Lodi, an Italian immigrant, World War II veteran, Silver Star recipient, and school teacher; and Clara Lodi, an educator. Lodi has four siblings. Her elder sister, Maria Barrett, is a United States Army Lieutenant General.

Lodi attended Rutgers University, graduating with a bachelor's degree. She also has a master's degrees in Public Administration, Military Arts and Science, and National Security and Strategic Studies.

Lodi is married to Henry R. Vance III, a retired command sergeant major. They married on June 27, 1994, in Bell County, Texas.

Military career
Lodi received a commission as a second lieutenant in the United States Army as a Distinguished Military Graduate of Rutgers University ROTC program and Medical Service Corps. She served with the Forward Support Battalions in the 3rd Infantry Division in Schweinfurt, Germany, and with 4th Infantry Division at Fort Hood, Texas. She has served as Ambulance Platoon Leader, Battalion S1 and S4, Support Ops Maintenance Officer, Brigade S4, and company commander. Lodi also served as Deputy Chief of Managed Care, Hospital Executive Officer at Darnall Army Medical Center, III Corps Plans Officer, Executive Officer for 21st Combat Support Hospital, Deputy Brigade Commander for 1st Medical Brigade, Operations Officer for the 18th MEDCOM DCS-OPS in Seoul, South Korea, and Chief, Military Personnel at William Beaumont Army Medical Center at Fort Bliss. At the Pentagon, Lodi served as the Executive Officer to the Director of the Army Staff.

Lodi has served in numerous command assignments, including of the 44th Medical Brigade, 15th Sustainment Brigade Special Troops Battalion, and 14th Combat Support Hospital. She was Chief and Leader of the Training Center at the AMEDD Center & School. She was also the Deputy Chief of Staff of Operations for the Office of the Surgeon General and United States Army Medical Command, as well as the Commanding General of the Regional Health Command in the Atlantic.

Lodi has graduated from the Command and General Staff College & School of Advanced Military Studies, and the Naval War College as a Distinguished Honor Graduate. She was promoted to brigadier general on June 2, 2019. She was nominated for promotion to major general on May 12, 2022, and the promotion took effect on February 3, 2023.

Awards
 Legion of Merit (4 Oak Leaf Clusters) 
 Bronze Star Medal (2 Oak Leaf Clusters)  
 Meritorious Service Medal (6 Oak Leaf Clusters) 
 Humanitarian Service Medal   
 Military Outstanding Volunteer Service Medal    
 Expert Field Medical Badge    
 Parachutist Badge

Honors
 Recipient – Dr. Mary E. Walker and the St. Joan D’Arc Awards 
 Official Order of Military Medical Merit (O2M3). 
 "A" proficiency designator awarded by the Surgeon General.

References

Living people
People from Franklin, Massachusetts
Recipients of the Legion of Merit
United States Army generals
United States Army personnel of the Gulf War
United States Army personnel of the Iraq War
Year of birth missing (living people)